The 1993 South American Cross Country Championships took place on February 20–21, 1993.  The races were held in Cali, Colombia.

For the first time, medals were awarded for teams.  A list of athletes announced to participate,
results of the top 10 athletes, top 10 results for junior and youth competitions, and medal winners were published.

Medallists

Race results

Senior men's race (12 km)

Note: Athletes in parentheses did not score for the team result.

Junior (U20) men's race (8 km)

Note: Athletes in parentheses did not score for the team result.

Youth (U17) men's race (4 km)

Note: Athletes in parentheses did not score for the team result.

Senior women's race (6 km)

Note: Athletes in parentheses did not score for the team result.

Junior (U20) women's race (4 km)

Note: Athletes in parentheses did not score for the team result.

Youth (U17) women's race (4 km)

Note: Athletes in parentheses did not score for the team result.

Medal table (unofficial)

Note: Totals include both individual and team medals, with medals in the team competition counting as one medal.

Participation
According to an unofficial count, 89 athletes from 5 countries participated.

 (13)
 (16)
 (24)
 (34)
 (2)

See also
 1993 in athletics (track and field)

References

External links
 GBRathletics

South American Cross Country Championships
South American Cross Country Championships
South American Cross Country Championships
1993 in South American sport
International athletics competitions hosted by Colombia
Cross country running in Colombia
February 1993 sports events in South America